The Aeros-2 is a Ukrainian ultralight trike, designed and produced by Aeros of Kyiv. The aircraft is supplied as a complete ready-to-fly aircraft or as kit for amateur construction.

In the United States the design is marketed as the Venture and Velocity.

Design and development
Developed from the earlier Aeros-1, the Aeros-2 features a cable-braced hang glider-style high-wing, weight-shift controls, a two-seats-in-tandem open cockpit, tricycle landing gear and a single engine in pusher configuration.

The aircraft is made from square tubing, with its wing covered in Dacron sailcloth. Its  span wing is supported by a single tube-type kingpost and uses an "A" frame control bar. The occupants are housed in streamlined fibreglass cockpit fairing. Engines available include the twin cylinder, two-stroke, liquid-cooled  Rotax 582 and the four cylinder four-stroke  Rotax 912UL and  912ULS. Engine mounts for BMW and Subaru engines are also available. Available wings to be mated to the carriage are the Aeros Profi, Aeros Stranger, Aeros Stream and Aeros Still. The wing-mounting pylon is foldable, allowing the wing to be installed by one person. Floats and ski landing gear are optional.

Variants
Venture 500
Aeros-2 equipped with the Rotax 503 for the US market.
Venture 600
Aeros-2 equipped with the Rotax 582 for the US market.

Specifications (Aeros-2 912)

References

External links

1990s Ukrainian ultralight aircraft
Homebuilt aircraft
Single-engined pusher aircraft
Ultralight trikes
2